Japhet Monroe Lynn (December 27, 1913 – October 27, 1977) was a professional baseball player who played pitcher in Major League Baseball (MLB) from 1939–40 and 1944. He would play for the Chicago Cubs, Detroit Tigers, and New York Giants. Although is MLB career lasted only three season, his professional baseball career encompassed 23 season.

Although Lynn only pitched right-handed in games, he sometimes threw batting practice left-handed.

Several highlights of Lynn's minor league career came in 1937 while pitching for the Jacksonville Jax (Jacksonville, Texas in the East Texas League), when he posted a 32–13 win–loss record (leading all of professional baseball), 2.65 ERA with 233 strikeouts. He also had a breakout year in 1943 while pitching for the Los Angeles Angels in the Pacific Coast League finishing the year with a league-leading 21–8 record and 2.47 ERA.

Lynn "once told The Sporting News, 'I was a real yokel when it came to pitching. In my first game, when the catcher held down one finger, I thought he wanted me to hold the ball with one finger. I didn't know I was supposed to pitch a fast ball, which happened to be my only pitch. So I held the ball with one finger and it sailed over the catcher's head. When he held down two fingers (for a curve) I put two fingers on the ball. I was really dumb.'"

In Lynn's brief three-season MLB career, he compiled a 10–8 record, 3.95 ERA, and 85 strikeouts, while surrendering 85 walks.

Lynn work diverse jobs during the off-season including involvement in boxing and wrestling as well as a rodeo cowboy and railroad laborer.

Lynn died on October 27, 1977, in Bellville, Texas.

References

External links

Venezuelan Professional Baseball League statistics

1913 births
1977 deaths
Asheville Tourists players
Bakersfield Boosters players
Baseball players from Texas
Beaumont Exporters players
Chicago Cubs players
Columbus Red Birds players
Detroit Tigers players
Hollywood Stars players
Huntington Red Birds players
Jacksonville Jax players
Jersey City Giants players
Los Angeles Angels (minor league) players
Lubbock Hubbers players
Major League Baseball pitchers
Minor league baseball managers
New York Giants (NL) players
Patriotas de Venezuela players
Portland Beavers players
Salt Lake City Bees players
Springfield Redbirds players